Freeman Clark Griswold (December 15, 1858 – January 29, 1910) was an American lawyer and politician who served as a member of the Massachusetts House of Representatives.

Early life
Griswold was born to Whiting and Fannie L. (Clark) Griswold.  Griswold was left an orphan in 1874 when his father died.

Education
Griswold attended Williston Seminary graduating in 1877, he then attended Yale University graduating with his A.B. in 1881, he then entered Harvard Law School graduating with his L.L.B. in 1884.

References

1858 births
People from Greenfield, Massachusetts
Democratic Party members of the Massachusetts House of Representatives
Massachusetts lawyers
New York (state) lawyers
Williston Northampton School alumni
Yale University alumni
Harvard Law School alumni
1910 deaths
19th-century American politicians
19th-century American lawyers